The 2021 FIA Junior World Rally Championship was the twentieth season of the Junior World Rally Championship, an auto racing championship recognised by the Fédération Internationale de l'Automobile, running in support of the World Rally Championship. The Junior World Rally Championship is open to drivers under the age of thirty—although no such restriction existed for co-drivers—competing in identical one-litre Ford Fiesta R2s built and maintained by M-Sport. The championship began in April 2021 at the Croatia Rally.

Tom Kristensson and Joakim Sjöberg were the defending drivers' and co-drivers' champions while Sweden was the defending Nations' Trophy winner. Sami Pajari and Marko Salminen became the first Finnish crew to win the championship. Finland took the Nations' Trophy victory.

Calendar 
The following events are under contract to be run as part of the 2021 Junior World Rally Championship. Each event is taken from the 2021 World Rally Championship calendar.

Calendar changes
Rally Croatia will make its championship début. The Ypres Rally will also make its début, replacing Rally GB. Rally Catalunya will return to the schedule after being removed from the 2020 calendar before the COVID-19 pandemic disrupted the championship. Rally Italia Sardegna was removed from the calendar. Rally Sweden was omitted from the Junior World Rally Championship calendar before it was removed from the wider World Rally Championship schedule. The Rally Monza was also removed from the calendar as it was only included on the 2020 schedule in response to the pandemic.

Entries 
The following crews are expected to compete in the championship:

Results and standing

Season summary

Scoring system
Points were awarded to the top ten classified finishers. An additional point was given for every stage win. The best four results out of five counted towards the final drivers’ and co-drivers’ standings. However, all points gained from stage wins were retained. Double points were awarded for drivers' championship at the season's finale.

FIA Junior World Rally Championship for Drivers

FIA Junior World Rally Championship for Co-Drivers

FIA Junior WRC Trophy for Nations

References

External links
  
 FIA Junior World Rally Championship 2021 at eWRC-results.com

Junior World Rally Championship